Classy (stylized as CLASSy or CLASS:y) is a South Korean girl group formed through the MBC reality competition show My Teenage Girl and co-managed by M25, a subsidiary of MBK Entertainment, and Universal Music Japan. The group consists of seven members: Won Ji-min, Kim Seon-you, Myung Hyung-seo, Hong Hye-ju, Kim Ri-won, Park Bo-eun and Yoon Chae-won. They officially debuted on May 5, 2022, with the extended play (EP) Class Is Over.

Name
The group's name, Class:y, was suggested by the viewers of My Teenage Girl through the website Naver and chosen by M25. It was inspired by the members' "classy" charms and continued the school-related theme of My Teenage Girl, referencing "class" and "highest grade".

Career

Formation through My Teenage Girl

Classy was formed through the MBC reality competition show My Teenage Girl which aired from  November 28, 2021, to February 27, 2022. It featured 83 female contestants from different countries. During the live finale on February 27, 2022, the final members were determined by viewers through voting and points.

Myung Hyung-seo is a former member of Busters; Kim Ri-won is a former child actress and model.

2022-present: Class is Over, Lives Across, Day&Night and Dancing Dol Stage
In March, the group performed the song "Surprise" on various music shows. Their debut extended play, Class Is Over, was released on May 5. On May 26, 2022, Classy released their second series of their debut extended play, Lives Across.

On May 10, 2022, they announced they will make their Japanese debut with the Japanese version of their Korean debut lead single "Shut Down" on June 22.

On September 20, 2022, it was confirmed that Classy will make a comeback with a new album on October 26, 2022. On October 11, Classy posted a picture of their new album Day&Night schedule via SNS.

In November 2022, it was announced Classy would release a Japanese album in January 2023.  On November 22, it was announced Classy will participate as a contestant in second season of the SBS reality competition show Dancing Dol Stage. On December 21, it was announced that Classy would return with their second Japanese single titled Target and hold their first fan concert in Japan in February 2023. 

On February 7, it was announced Classy would be a contestant in their third survival show, The Next - Battle of The K-Pop Girl Groups.

Members
 Myung Hyung-seo
 Yoon Chae-won
 Hong Hye-ju – leader
 Kim Ri-won
 Won Ji-min
 Park Bo-eun
 Kim Seon-you

Discography

Extended plays

Singles

Filmography

Television shows

Web shows

Concerts
 Classy Japan Fan Concert "Steal Your Heart" (2023)

Awards and nominations

Notes

References

External links 
 

Musical groups from Seoul
2022 establishments in South Korea
Musical groups established in 2022
Singing talent show winners
South Korean girl groups
K-pop music groups
South Korean dance music groups
South Korean pop music groups
Reality show winners